Callimedusa perinesos is a species of frog in the subfamily Phyllomedusinae. It is found on the Amazonian slopes of the Andes in Colombia (Caquetá Department) and Ecuador (Napo and, at least formerly, Sucumbíos Provinces). Common name orange-spotted leaf frog has been proposed for it.

The eggs are laid on inside leaves rolled up in ponds and pools of water. It is a rare species that is threatened by habitat loss (deforestation), including destruction of its breeding pools.

References

perinesos
Amphibians of the Andes
Amphibians of Colombia
Amphibians of Ecuador
Amphibians described in 1973
Taxa named by William Edward Duellman
Taxonomy articles created by Polbot